The 1941 East Tennessee State Teachers Buccaneers football team was an American football team that represented State Teachers College, Johnson City—now known as East Tennessee State University (ETSU)—as a member of the Smoky Mountain Conference during the 1941 college football season. Led by tenth-year head coach Gene McMurray, the Buccaneers compiled an overall record of 2–5 with a mark of 0–3 in conference play, placing last out of four teams in the Smoky Mountain Conference. Jim Mooney, the head baseball coach, stepped in to assist with the football team. Buck Hunt and Bill Mitchell served as team co-captains. East Tennessee State did not field another football team until 1946, after the end of World War II.

Schedule

References

East Tennessee State Teachers
East Tennessee State Buccaneers football seasons
East Tennessee State Teachers Buccaneers football